Latifiya, named after Latifiya river, is an Iraqi town south of Baghdad, between Mahmoudiyah and Iskandariya, inhabited originally by 97,043 people. It has a mix of Sunni and Shia Muslim population, and surrounded by in the west and the east by rural areas dominated by Sunni Arabs, while its countryside and towns to the north and south are Shia in their majority. 

During the period between 2003 and 2007, Latifiya was one of the most dangerous places for the Coalition Forces. The insurgent groups operated almost freely in Latifiya and the neighboring Sunni dominated Yusufiya. Nearly all of the Shia citizens were ethnically cleansed, being chased off to Mahmoudiyah, Nasiriya and Iskandariya nearby. They returned after the defeat of the Sunni insurgents by the Shi'ite Mahdi army by 2006. In 2014–15, the ISIS jihadists once again expelled the Shia population. With their defeat in 2017, once again the Shia returned, but this time it was the turn for the Sunni population to be harassed and deported.

It is home to the 1/4/6 Iraqi Army Battalion and US Patrol Base Latifiya (FOB ROW).

References

Populated places in Babil Governorate